Bobr (also given as Bobr East) was an air base in Belarus located  west of Talacyn. It appears to have been a forward deployment field. It is now plowed under into farmland.

References
RussianAirFields.com

Soviet Air Force bases
Military installations of Belarus
Airports in Belarus

Belarusian Air Force